Heinz Hechenberger (born 9 February 1963) is an Austrian former cyclist. He won the Austrian National Road Race Championships in 1990.

References

External links
 

1963 births
Living people
Austrian male cyclists
Place of birth missing (living people)
20th-century Austrian people